Sercan is a masculine Turkish given name. Notable people with the name include:

 Sercan Görgülü, Turkish footballer
 Sercan Güvenışık, Turkish footballer
 Sercan Sararer, Turkish footballer
 Sercan Yıldırım, Turkish footballer

Turkish masculine given names